Beaucroissant is a commune in the Isère department in the Auvergne-Rhône-Alpes region of south-eastern France.

The inhabitants of the commune are known as Manants or Manantes.

Geography
Beaucroissant is located some 32 km south by south-east of Bourgoin-Jallieu and 25 km north-west of Grenoble. Access to the commune is by the D1085 road from La Frette in the north-west which passes through the commune just north of the village and continues east to Moirans. The D519 comes from Izeaux in the west and passes through the commune turning north to join the A48 autoroute at Exit . A railway from Le Grand-Lemps passes through the commune with a station in the village and continues north-east to Rives. Apart from the village there is the hamlet of Le Mollard. Apart from the large urban area of the village and Le Mollard the commune is mainly farmland.

Toponymy
Beaucroissant appears as Beaucroißant on the 1750 Cassini Map and as Beaucroissant on the 1790 version.

History

The commune is famous for its annual fair which has continued since 1219 due to the pilgrimage of Our Lady of Parménie. The history of the village and the Fair is linked with the Parménie hill that dominates the commune with its 749-metre altitude.

The origin of the Beaucroissant fair dates back to 14 September 1219 when the Saint Laurent lake (above the Bourg d'Oisans) overflowed causing a terrible flood that inundated Grenoble and had many victims. Starting from 14 September 1220, organised by the bishop of Grenoble, survivors commemorated this event with a pilgrimage to Parménie. They were so numerous that a village was needed to accommodate them. The assembly attracted many merchants so the Fair of Beaucroissant was begun.

Heraldry

Administration

List of Successive Mayors

Demography
In 2017 the commune had 1,725 inhabitants.

Economy
The Beaucroissant Fair, which takes place twice a year, is the main economy of the commune. In 2015 it took place on 25 and 26 April and on 11, 12, and 13 September together with the cattle fair on  Friday 11 September.

Sites and Monuments
A Composite Church contains two items that are registered as historical objects:
A Bronze Bell (1548)
A Reliquary-Monstrance (17th century)
The Priory of Our Lady of Parménie was a Chartreuse of women in the 13th century. It was burnt down in the 15th century, rebuilt in the 17th century, burnt down in 1944, then restored.

See also
Communes of the Isère department

References

Communes of Isère